The 2013–14 Detroit Titans men's basketball team represented the University of Detroit Mercy in the 2013–14 NCAA Division I men's basketball season. Their head coach was Ray McCallum. The Titans played their home games at Calihan Hall and were members of the Horizon League. They finished the season 13–19, 6–10 in Horizon League play to finish in a tie for seventh place. They lost in the first round of the Horizon League tournament to Milwaukee.

Roster

Schedule

|-
!colspan=9 style="background:#F5002F; color:#0048E0;"| Regular season

|-
!colspan=9 style="background:#F5002F; color:#0048E0;"| 2014 Horizon League tournament

References

Detroit Titans
Detroit Mercy Titans men's basketball seasons
Detroit Titans men's b
Detroit Titans men's b